The Limmattal light rail line is a metre gauge light rail line with an alignment running through the Limmat Valley, in the Swiss cantons of Aargau and Zürich to the west of the city of Zürich.

History
The Limmat Valley is a major transport corridor. Its first railway was the first line in Switzerland, the so-called Spanisch-Brötli-Bahn that opened in 1847, and that line now carries long-distance passenger trains, freight trains and suburban trains of the Zürich S-Bahn. However the stations of the S-Bahn are well separated, with only five stations in the distance to be covered by the Limmattal line. The Limmattal tramway provided more local transport from 1900, but closed in stages between 1928 and 1955, being replaced by buses. The roads of the Limmat Valley are now at capacity, leading to delays to both bus and car traffic. It estimated that traffic will continue to grow, with 113,000 extra journeys a day by 2030.

It is against this background that the Limmattal light rail line was proposed as a solution. Planning began in 2000, and by 2007 the line was included in the cantonal plans of Aargau and Zürich. In 2010, the Limmattalbahn AG company was founded by the cantons to plan and implement the infrastructure for the line. A referendum, held in November 2015, approved the construction of the line, and it was announced in May 2016 that the line would be operated by BDWM Transport, now part of Aargau Verkehr, who also operate the Bremgarten–Dietikon line. Construction commenced in August 2017, and phase 1 between Farbhof and Schlieren opened in September 2019. A further referendum called by opponents in the canton of Zürich in an attempt to have phase 2 cancelled was defeated, and the line was opened throughout on December 11 2022.

Service
Light rail trains run every 15 minutes between Zürich-Altstetten and Killwangen-Spreitenbach stations, with the option to later increase the frequency to every 7.5 minutes. The line is double-track throughout, and over 90% segregated from road traffic. The stretch of the line between Farbhof and Schlieren was already in use by an extension of Zürich tram route 2, running every 7.5 minutes and replacing the existing Zürich trolleybus route 31 over that stretch. This section continues to be served by both services. The Limmattal and Bremgarten–Dietikon lines also share a short section of track on the existing alignment of the latter in the centre of Dietikon.

Infrastructure
From Farbhof to Schlieren the line is electrified at 600 V DC for compatibility with the Zürich tram network, and the section of phase 2 between Altstetten and Farbhof is also electrified at this voltage. The rest of the line is electrified at 1200 V DC, which is also used by the Bremgarten–Dietikon line. A joint order, with Baselland Transport, has been placed with Stadler for the supply of light rail vehicles to operate the service from Altstetten to Killwangen. The extension of Zürich tram line 2 is operated by the existing single-ended Zürich tram fleet, for which a turning loop has been provided at Schlieren.

The Federal Office of Transport granted authorization in  2020 for the construction of a depot for the line at Müsli, between Dietikon and Spreitenbach. The depot is expected to cost 40 million francs and will provide parking space for 14 light rail vehicles. In addition to open parking spaces, the facility also includes a building with a maintenance area and a washing facility.

References

External links
Official web site of Limmattalbahn AG

Aargau Verkehr railway lines
Proposed railway lines in Switzerland
Railway lines opened in 2019
Transport in Aargau
Transport in the canton of Zürich
Transport in Zürich